For the presidency of Franklin D. Roosevelt, see:
 Presidency of Franklin D. Roosevelt, first and second terms (1933–1937 and 1937–1941), as U.S. president
 Presidency of Franklin D. Roosevelt, third and fourth terms (1941–1945 and January–April 1945), as U.S. president

See also
 Timeline of the Franklin D. Roosevelt presidency

Presidency
Roosevelt, Franklin D.